Dominique Dupuy (born 26 August 1957) is a French racing driver.

Dupuy began racing professionally in 1983 in Championnat de France Formule Renault Turbo finishing 4th. He moved to the French Formula Three Championship the following year and raced there until 1988. After that, he moved to the professional French Porsche 944 Cup series and moved to the French Porsche Carrera Cup in 1991 where he would race until 1999. He won the series championship 5 times ( record ) in 1993,1994,1997,1998 and 1999, with 40 wins (record) and would move onto the Porsche Supercup in 1995, winning 3rd place honors in Supercup in 1997.  
He also won two times (1993-1994) 24 Hours of Le Mans in GT class with Porsche. Double program for 1999, he won the French Porsche Carrera cup and finish 5th to the FIA GT World Championship with only 3 participations over 12 races. After that he moved to the French GT Championship he signed on to drive a Chrysler Viper GTS-R, he won the championship two times (2000-2001), he also race with this viper in Spanish championship and he finish vice-champion. Prior to the season beginning Dupuy and his Oreca teammates Olivier Beretta and Karl Wendlinger were the surprise overall winners of the 24 Hours of Daytona in their Viper.

Dupuy and the Oreca team were also the GTS champions of the 24 Hours of Le Mans in both 1999 and 2000. He also won 12H Sebring and Adelaide (2000).  
Dupuy and his teammate François Fiat would go on to win the French GT Championship that year and repeated the feat in 2001. He brought the first Saleen S7R in France in 2003 until 2005. He retired from full-time competition in 2005 after and has not driven in French GT since 2007.
He is now technical director of the First Racing team with 2 Lamborghini Gallardo in FFSA GT3.

Racing record

24 Hours of Le Mans results

External links
Profile at Driver Database
Profile at Speedsport Magazine

1957 births
Living people
French racing drivers
French Formula Renault 2.0 drivers
French Formula Three Championship drivers
Rolex Sports Car Series drivers
24 Hours of Le Mans drivers
FIA GT Championship drivers
24 Hours of Daytona drivers
Porsche Supercup drivers

Oreca drivers
Larbre Compétition drivers